Federated States of Micronesia competed at the 2022 World Aquatics Championships in Budapest, Hungary from 18 June to 3 July.

Swimming

Swimmers from Federated States of Micronesia have achieved qualifying standards in the following events.

References

Nations at the 2022 World Aquatics Championships
Federated States of Micronesia at the World Aquatics Championships
2022 in Federated States of Micronesia sport